Samuel M. Dangwa (born October 19, 1935 - April 3, 2019) is a Filipino politician. He has been elected to five terms as a Member of the House of Representatives, representing the defunct 2nd District of Benguet from 1987 to 1995, and the Lone District of Benguet from 2001 to 2010. He was a member of the  LAKAS-CMD Party.

A lawyer by profession, Dangwa had also served as Vice-Governor of Benguet from 1972 to 1980, and Assemblyman from Benguet in the Regular Batasang Pambansa from 1984 to 1986.

References

 

20th-century Filipino lawyers
1935 births
Living people
Lakas–CMD (1991) politicians
Members of the House of Representatives of the Philippines from Benguet
Independent politicians in the Philippines
Laban ng Demokratikong Pilipino politicians
Lakas–CMD politicians
Partido para sa Demokratikong Reporma politicians
Members of the Batasang Pambansa